Albert Holden Illingworth, 1st Baron Illingworth PC (25 May 1865 – 23 January 1942), was a British businessman and Liberal politician. He served as Postmaster General between 1916 and 1921 in David Lloyd George's coalition government.

Background and education
Illingworth was the second son of Henry Illingworth, of Bradford, the member of an old Yorkshire family, and his wife Mary, daughter of Sir Isaac Holden, 1st Baronet. Percy Illingworth was his younger brother. His sister, Mary Gertrude Darnton (née Illingworth, 1871-1952), married in 1894 John Edward Darnton (formerly Schunck), sister of Baroness Airedale née  Florence Schunck. Illingworth  was educated at the London International College and became a partner in the family firm of Daniel Illingworth and Sons, spinners, and Chairman of Isaac Holden et Fils.

Political career
In a 1915 by-election Illingworth was returned to Parliament for Heywood, a seat he held until the constituency was abolished in 1918, and then sat for Heywood and Radcliffe until 1921. He served under David Lloyd George as Postmaster General from 1916 to 1921 and was sworn of the Privy Council in 1916. In 1921 he was raised to the peerage as Baron Illingworth, of Denton in the West Riding of the County of York. The territorial designation derived from Denton Hall which he had purchased in 1920. However, the estate was sold already in 1925. Following his elevation to the peerage the Heywood and Radcliffe constituency was won in the subsequent by-election by the Labour candidate Walter Halls, a farm labourer employed by Illingworth.

Family

Lord Illingworth married firstly Annie Elizabeth, daughter of Isaac Holden Crothers, in 1895. They had no children and were divorced in 1926. He married secondly Margaret Mary Clare, daughter of William Basil Wilberforce, in 1931. This marriage was also childless. Illingworth died in January 1942, aged 76, when the barony became extinct. His second wife died in 1986, having become before her death the victim of a massive defrauding of her estate by her niece who had been investigated over the murder of Simon Dale, the latter's ex-husband.

References

External links 
 
 
 
Article on Margaret, Lady Illingworth

1865 births
1942 deaths
Politicians from Bradford
Businesspeople from Bradford
20th-century British politicians
UK MPs 1910–1918
UK MPs who were granted peerages
Liberal Party (UK) MPs for English constituencies
Members of the Parliament of the United Kingdom for English constituencies
United Kingdom Postmasters General
Members of the Privy Council of the United Kingdom
Barons in the Peerage of the United Kingdom
Albert
Barons created by George V